The estuary of the Saint Lawrence in Quebec, Canada, is one of the largest esturaries in the world.

Situation 
The estuary of the St. Lawrence River is located downstream of the St. Lawrence River and upstream of the Gulf of St. Lawrence. It refers to the place where the fresh and salt waters mix between the river and the gulf. The St. Lawrence Estuary begins at Lake Saint-Pierre and ends at the widening of the shores, at the height of Pointe-des-Monts, Quebec, opposite Les Méchins, Quebec. It is divided into three sections: the St. Lawrence River estuary at Île d'Orléans (Orleans Island), the middle estuary to the Saguenay River, the maritime estuary to Pointe-des-Monts, Quebec.

The St. Lawrence Estuary is characterized by a saline front at the eastern tip of Île d'Orléans. This zone of maximum turbidity is located between Île d'Orléans (salinity greater than 0 PSU) and Île aux Coudres (salinity below 10 PSU). The mechanisms of estuarine circulation associated with this environment make it a privileged site of primary and secondary production which shelters many fish nurseries. High environmental turbidity provides shelter against predators while larvae are maintained under optimum temperature and salinity conditions. Large variations in salinity and turbidity result in a wide variety of physicochemical conditions and planktonic communities on the river.

Fauna and flora 
An emblematic species is the beluga (beluga whale), but many other species are present. A census of estuary fish was completed in 2008.

See also

Notes 

Estuaries of Canada
Estuary